Stefania Orlando (born 23 December 1966) is an Italian showgirl, television personality and singer.

She debuted in 1993 as a showgirl for the Mediaset quiz Sì o No?, then she found her success by conducting the morning show of Rai 2 I fatti vostri from 1997 to 2003.

Television 
Sì o no? (Canale 5, 1993–1994)
Scommettiamo che...? (Rai 1, 1994–1995)
TG Rosa (Odeon TV, 1995–1997)
Il Boom (Canale 5, 1996)
Retromarsh (Telemontecarlo, 1996–1997)
I fatti vostri (Rai 2, 1997–2000, 2001–2003, 2015–2017) - talent show judge for Dog Factor
Telethon (Rai 1, 1997–2000)
Il lotto alle otto (Rai 2, 1998–2005, 2010)
Torno sabato (Rai 1, 2002) – Reporter
Girofestival (Rai 3, 2002–2003)
Uno di noi (Rai 1, 2003) – Reporter
Piazza grande (Rai 2, 2003–2004)
Stelle con la coda (Rai 2, 2004)
Cantagiro (Rai 2, 2005)
Festival Show (Canale Italia, 2008)
Unomattina in famiglia (Rai 1, Dal 2011 – 2020) - Columnist
Cantando ballando (Canale Italia, 2015–2016)
Buon pomeriggio Estate (Telenorba, TG Norba 24, 2017)
Buon pomeriggio (Telenorba, TG Norba 24, 2017)
Miss Europe Continental – Finale nazionale Italia (Canale Italia, 2018)
Grande Fratello VIP (Canale 5, 2020) – Contestant

Filmography 
Fantozzi 2000 - La clonazione, directed by Domenico Saverni (1999) – Cameo
Don Matteo – TV show, episode 6x03 (2008)
Nuovo Ordine Mondiale, directed by Fabio Ferrara and Marco Ferrara (2015)
Il paradiso delle signore – Soap (2019)

Theatre 
Isso, esso e 'a Mala Femmena, directed by Vittorio Marsiglia (1995–1996)
Ragioné voi dovete ragionà, directed by Vittorio Marsiglia (1996–1997)

Discography

Album 
2009 – Su e giù

Singles 
2007 – Sotto la luna
2008 – Marimbabà
2009 – Su e giù
2011 – Crazy Dance
2011 – A Troia
2012 – Frappé
2012 – Vita bastarda
2013 – Omologazione
2014 – Favola (Fernando Alba feat. Stefania Orlando)
2015 – Legami al Letto
2016 – Prima di lunedì (Fernando Alba feat. Stefania Orlando)
2020 – Babilonia
2021 – Bandolero

Music Videos 
2011 – Marimbabà
2011 – Crazy Dance
2011 – Sotto la luna
2011 – A Troia
2012 – A Troia Remix
2012 – Frappé
2012 – Vita bastarda
2013 – Omologazione
2014 – Favola
2015 – Legami al letto
2016 – Kiss
2016 – Prima di lunedì

References

External links 

 
 

1966 births
20th-century Italian actresses
21st-century Italian actresses
Italian showgirls
Italian stage actresses
Living people